Streptomyces fodineus is a bacterium species from the genus of Streptomyces which has been isolated from soil from a mine. Streptomyces fodineus has antifungal properties.

See also 
 List of Streptomyces species

References 

fodineus
Bacteria described in 2019